Progress 25 was a Soviet uncrewed Progress cargo spacecraft, which was launched in March 1986 to resupply the Mir space station.

Launch
Progress 25 launched on 19 March 1986 from the Baikonur Cosmodrome in the Kazakh SSR. It used a Soyuz-U2 rocket.

Docking
Progress 25 docked with the aft port of the Mir Core Module on 21 March 1986 at 11:16:02 UTC, and was undocked on 20 April 1986 at 19:24:08 UTC.

Decay
It remained in orbit until 21 April 1986, when it was deorbited. The deorbit burn occurred at 00:00 UTC and the mission ended at 00:48:30 UTC.

See also

 1986 in spaceflight
 List of Progress missions
 List of uncrewed spaceflights to Mir

References

Progress (spacecraft) missions
1986 in the Soviet Union
Spacecraft launched in 1986
Spacecraft which reentered in 1986
Spacecraft launched by Soyuz-U rockets